Mukti is an Indian Bengali language historical period drama original web series streaming on OTT platform ZEE5. It is written and directed by Rohan Ghose. The series has been produced by Pritam Chowdhury under the production house Fatfish Entertainment. This nine-episode web series was released on 26 January 2022. It stars Ritwick Chakraborty, Arjun Chakrabarty and Ditipriya Roy in the lead roles.

Plot 
The story set in 1931, revolving around a conspiracy and a football match that pits the Indian revolutionaries against the British.

Cast 

 Ritwick Chakraborty as Ram Kinkar Ghosh
 Arjun Chakrabarty as Dibakar Bandhobadhyay
 Ditipriya Roy as Minu
 Sudip Sarkar as Rahamat Ali
 Chitrangada Satarupa as Prava
 Carl A Harte as Alfred Petty
 Chandreyee Ghosh
 Shaheb Chattopadhyay
 Biswarup Biswas as Kanto

Episodes list

Release 
ZEE5 announced the launch of a trailer on 14 January 2021 and the series was released on 26 January 2022.

Reception

Critical reviews 
Shaheen Irani of Ottplay has given 3/5 stars stating that Ritwick Chakraborty's series would have been more impactful in movie format. Various elements of the series have stretched, and the story runs in circles between the stubborn rebels and the mean officers. The climax scene is slightly different from all the other sports dramas, which comes with emotions. However, that makes it a notch above the visuals.

Binged team has given 4.75/10 stars stating that it is well-intentioned drama but hampered by tedious length. The performance of Ritwick Chakraborty is as charming and winsome as Ramkinkar Babu. He delivers a polished and restrained performance in both his avatars. Arjun Chakraborty and Satyam Bhattacharya were equally impactful in their performances. The musical score is soothing to listen to, while the background score gets too loud boisterous at times, but overall it was good. Cinematography and editing were executed well by capturing the rural Bengal of the early twentieth century.

Suparna Majumdar of Sangbad Pratidin has given 2.5/5 stars stating that the web series tells the story of the fight for freedom of India's freedom struggle on the football field. The performances of lead roles were impressive. The cinematography of the series was good, and the story of the early Bengal can easily be seen at times from him.

References

External links 
 Mukti at ZEE5
 

Indian web series
Bengali-language web series
2022 web series debuts